Panna Lal Punia, usually known as P. L. Punia, is an Indian politician and Member of the Rajya Sabha from Uttar Pradesh from 2014 till 2020. He was member of the Lok Sabha from 2009 to 2014 and represented Barabanki (Lok Sabha constituency). He is a Dalit leader of the Indian National Congress party. He was also chairperson of the National Commission for Scheduled Castes between 2013-16 and as such sat ex officio on the National Human Rights Commission (NHRC).

In July 2012, Punia appeared in the popular TV show Satyamev Jayate, hosted by Bollywood star Aamir Khan, to raise awareness of discrimination against scheduled castes.

Early life
He was born on 23 January 1945 to Bharat Singh and Dakhan Devi in the Jhajjar district of the Punjab region (now Haryana), British India. He took an M.A. from Panjab University, Chandigarh and a PhD from Lucknow University, Uttar Pradesh. In 1970 he joined the Indian Administrative Service (IAS), becoming District Magistrate in Aligarh during 1982–85.

References

India MPs 2009–2014
Indian National Congress politicians
Indian Administrative Service officers
Living people
1945 births
Lok Sabha members from Uttar Pradesh
Rajya Sabha members from Uttar Pradesh
People from Jhajjar district
Chairmans of the National Commission for Scheduled Castes
United Progressive Alliance candidates in the 2014 Indian general election
People from Barabanki district
Indian National Congress politicians from Uttar Pradesh